British Columbia is Canada's westernmost province, and has established several provincial symbols.

Official symbols

Other Symbols

References 

 
British Columbia
Symbols
Canadian provincial and territorial symbols